Gerson Liliano Sanches Sousa (born 19 May 2002) is a Portuguese professional footballer who plays as a winger for Benfica B in Liga Portugal 2.

Playing career
On 29 May 2019, Sousa signed his first professional contract with Benfica B. Sousa made his professional debut with Benfica B in a 3-2 LigaPro win over Leixões S.C. on 1 November 2020.

Honours
Benfica
Under-20 Intercontinental Cup: 2022

References

External links
 
 
 

2002 births
Living people
People from Seixal
Portuguese footballers
Portugal youth international footballers
Portuguese people of Cape Verdean descent
Association football wingers
Liga Portugal 2 players
S.L. Benfica B players
Sportspeople from Setúbal District